6,7-Methylenedioxy-2-aminotetralin (MDAT) is a drug developed in the 1990s by a team at Purdue University led by David E. Nichols. It appears to act as a serotonin releasing agent based on rodent drug discrimination assays comparing it to MDMA, in which it fully substitutes for, and additionally lacks any kind of serotonergic neurotoxicity. Hence, MDAT is considered likely to be a non-neurotoxic, putative entactogen in humans.

See also
 2-Aminotetralin

References

Aminotetralins
Entactogens and empathogens
Benzodioxoles
Designer drugs
Serotonin releasing agents